Fusciphantes is a genus of Asian dwarf spiders that was first described by R. Oi in 1960.

Species
 it contains ten species, found in Japan:
Fusciphantes enmusubi (Ihara, Nakano & Tomikawa, 2017) – Japan
Fusciphantes hibanus (Saito, 1992) – Japan
Fusciphantes iharai (Saito, 1992) – Japan
Fusciphantes longiscapus Oi, 1960 (type) – Japan
Fusciphantes nojimai (Ihara, 1995) – Japan
Fusciphantes occidentalis (Ihara, Nakano & Tomikawa, 2017) – Japan
Fusciphantes okiensis (Ihara, 1995) – Japan
Fusciphantes saitoi (Ihara, 1995) – Japan
Fusciphantes setouchi (Ihara, 1995) – Japan
Fusciphantes tsurusakii (Ihara, 1995) – Japan

See also
 List of Linyphiidae species (A–H)

References

Araneomorphae genera
Linyphiidae
Spiders of Asia